This is a list of seasons completed by the Charlotte Rage. The Rage were a professional arena football franchise of the Arena Football League (AFL), based in Charlotte, North Carolina. The team was established in 1992. Though the Rage never had a winning season, they qualified for the playoffs twice, losing both games to the Arizona Rattlers. The franchise folded following the conclusion of the 1996 season. The team played its home games at the Charlotte Coliseum.

References
General
 

Arena Football League seasons by team
Charlotte Rage seasons
North Carolina sports-related lists